Wilhelmina "Mina" Karadžić-Vukomanović (12 July 1828, in Vienna – 12 June 1894, in ibidem) was an Austrian-born Serbian painter and writer.

She was born in Vienna, the daughter of Vuk Stefanović Karadžić and the Viennese Ana Maria Kraus. Karadžić died at the age of 65, in Vienna.

Works
Her best-known works are:
 Self-Portrait
 Portrait brother Dimitrije
 An old woman with a white cap
 Marko Kraljevic with a mace
 Marko Kraljevic sa šestopercem
 Young black man
 Montenegrin
 Greek hero
 Bosnjak with red Sarough
 Portrait of a girl with a red scarf
 The girl in a plaid dress
 Portrait of a Woman
 An old man with long hair
 The young man with a beard

References

1828 births
1894 deaths
Artists from Vienna
Austrian people of Serbian descent
19th-century Serbian painters
Serbian women painters
19th-century women artists
Burials at Serbian Orthodox monasteries and churches